Anna Maria Elisabeth Lisinska Jerichau-Baumann  (21 November 1819 – 11 July 1881) was a Polish-Danish painter. She was married to the sculptor Jens Adolf Jerichau.

Early life and career 
Elisabeth Jerichau-Baumann was born in Żoliborz (French: Joli Bord) a borough of Warsaw. Her father Philip Adolph Baumann (1776–1863), a mapmaker, and her mother, Johanne Frederikke Reyer (1790–1854), were of German extraction.

At the age of nineteen, she began her studies at the Kunstakademie Düsseldorf which at the time was one of the most important art centres in Europe and her early subject matter was drawn from Slovak life. She is associated with the Düsseldorf school of painting. She began exhibiting there and in 1844 attracted public attention for the first time. After she moved to Rome, her paintings were primarily of local life. When Baumann was not travelling, she spent many hours a day in her studio in Rome. She was particularly fond of the Italian painters. Baumann had great success abroad, however, and had a special following in France where she was twice represented at the World Fair in Paris, first  in 1867 and again in 1878.  In 1852 she exhibited some of her paintings in London, and Queen Victoria requested a private presentation in Buckingham Palace. Among the  portraits presented to the Queen was her painting of Hans Christian Andersen, completed in 1850.

The harems of the Ottoman Empire 
In 1869–1870 Baumann traveled extensively in the Eastern Mediterranean and Middle-East,  and again in 1874–1875 accompanied by her son Harald. Being a woman, she was able to gain access to the harems of the Ottoman Empire and as a result was able to paint scenes of harem life from personal observation, in contrast to most artists of the time, whose work on this popular subject was entirely derived from the imagination or other artists in the same position as themselves (see Orientalism). Nevertheless, as Roberts points out, she had to curb her desire to paint the women of the harems as Europeans liked to imagine them because they insisted on being painted in the latest Paris fashions.

In 1869, she was admitted into the harem of Mustafa Fazil Paşa. She was able to gain entry because of her royal patronage in Denmark and brought with her a letter of introduction from Princess Alexandra of Denmark by then the Princess of Wales. The princess had accompanied her husband (the future Edward VII) on a grand tour which included the Ottoman Empire, earlier that year, and therefore had great influence. But the fact that Mustafa was a liberal in favour of a Western style constitutional government and was a vocal proponent of modernization played an important part in her being granted entry. She was entranced by Mustafa Paşa's daughter Nazlı and wrote home to her husband and children, 'Yesterday I fell in love with a beautiful Turkish Princess'.

Her  work from this period is sometimes decorative and frequently sentimental but with a fine sense of colour and lighting. The sensualism in some of these paintings was still considered taboo in some parts of Europe and the Danish art world tried to keep these works out of sight. Until recently, her paintings were kept in museum storerooms in Denmark. The erotic quality in many of her husband's statues may have helped her to disregard this provincialism in spite of the obvious social risks to a woman at the time.

Personal life 

Baumann met her husband, Jens Adolf Jerichau, an art professor, in Rome.  They  married in 1846 and had nine children, two of whom died in infancy. Of the rest, several became accomplished painters including Harald Jerichau (1851–1878), who died of malaria and typhus in Rome, and Holger Hvitfeldt Jerichau (1861–1900) who painted primarily impressionistic landscapes. His work earned the favour of the Russian Royal Family whose patronage helped him finance his foreign travels. He was called "a true visionary and talented artist" by the art critics of the time and had many successful exhibitions but like his older brother died young at age 41. One of his paintings sold for over twelve thousand dollars in 1991.  She has several other descendants who are artists and her grandson J.A. Jerichau (1891–1916) was one of Denmark's most talented modernist painters.

Children 
Thorald Harald Adolph Carol Lorentz (1848)
Marie (1850)
Harald (1851)
Caroline Elisabeth Nanny (1853)
Louise (1859)
Sophie Dagmar Elisabeth (1859)
Holger Hvitfeldt (1861)

Selected works

Drawings
Portrait of Jenny Lind (1845), 19x21.5 Pencil
A child, 'Titi''' (1856), Gouache/paperAn Angel (1857) Watercolour, pencil/paperDamenportrait (1859)  19x13 InkPortraet af egyptisk kvinde or Portrait of an Egyptian fellah woman holding a wine jug (dated Cairo 1870). With Baraset House Fine Art.Höjtlaesning ved sygelejet (1878), 11.5x19 InkHöjtlaesning ved sygelejet (1878), 11.5x19 Ink/paperHavfrue 21x31, Pencil/paperAdam og Eva 32x21, Pencil/paperDameportraet, Pencil/paperPortraet af Johanne-Luise Heiberg, 8x6Ink, penLille dreng med bog, 31x21 Pencil/paper

 Written works 
Elisabeth Jerichau-Baumann wrote two books about her life:

 Ungdomserindringer (Youthful Memories) (1874)
 Brogede rejsebilleder (Motley Travel Pictures), Copenhagen (1881)

 See also 
 Art of Denmark
 Mermaid (Jerichau-Baumann)

 References 

 Bibliography 
 Nicolaj Bøgh, Elisabeth Jerichau-Baumann (Copenhagen 1886).
 Sigurd Müller, Nyere dansk Malerkunst, Copenhagen (1884).
 Peter Nørgaard Larsen, Elisabeth Jerichau Baumann, Øregaard Museum (1996)
 Peter Nørgaard Larsen in: Weilbach, Vol. 4, Copenhagen (1996).
 Elisabeth Oxfeldt, (2005), Nordic Orientalism: Paris and the Cosmopolitan Imagination 1800–1900, Museum Tusculanum Press. 
 Sine Krogh og Birgitte Fink, Breve fra London. Elisabeth Jerichau Baumann og den victorianske kunstverden'', Ny Carlsbergfondet og Strandberg Publishing (2018)

External links

 Source
 Source

1819 births
1881 deaths
19th-century Danish painters
19th-century Danish women artists
Artists from Warsaw
Danish people of German descent
Polish emigrants to Denmark
Recipients of the Thorvaldsen Medal
Polish women painters
Danish women painters
Düsseldorf school of painting
Orientalist painters